The Wild Grounds is a  biological Site of Special Scientific Interest in Gosport in Hampshire. It is also a   Local Nature Reserve, which is owned and managed by Gosport Borough Council.

This site was probably common land until around 1600, after which it developed into woodland dominated by oak trees. It is not rich in flora, but is of great interest ecologically and historically for its natural origin and its structure, being composed of oak trees around 500 years of age which will be allowed to live their natural life span.

Wildlife and Fauna 
Plant species in the Wild Ground include oak wall gasps and bluebells.

In terms of animals, emperor butterflies, meadow brown butterflies, gatekeeper butterflies, peacock butterflies, orange tip butterflies, green oak tortrix moths, woodpeckers, bats, owls, kestrels, buzzards, herons, kingfishers, ducks, squirrels, stag beetles, roe deer and foxes all live in the Wild Grounds.

References

 

Local Nature Reserves in Hampshire 
Sites of Special Scientific Interest in Hampshire